June Haver (born Beverly June Stovenour; June 10, 1926 – July 4, 2005) was an American film actress, singer, and dancer. Once groomed by 20th Century Fox to be "the next Betty Grable", Haver appeared in a string of musicals, but she never achieved Grable's popularity. Haver's second husband was the actor Fred MacMurray, whom she married after she retired from show business.

Early life
Born Beverly June Stovenour, June Haver was born in Rock Island, Illinois, and later took the surname of her stepfather, Bert Haver. Because her mother Maria Haver (née Carter) was an actress and her father Fred Christian Stovenour was a musician, Haver often considered which of the two careers she wanted to follow. After the family moved to Ohio, seven-year-old Haver entered and won a contest of the Cincinnati Conservatory of Music. At age eight, she won a film test by imitating famous actresses including Greta Garbo, Katharine Hepburn, and Helen Hayes, but her mother prohibited her from becoming a child actress because she felt that June was too young to work in the film industry.

When Haver was 10, the family moved back to Rock Island, where she began performing for Rudy Vallée and became a well-known child star on the radio. She worked regularly as a band singer by the time she was in her teens, performing with the Ted Fio Rito Orchestra for $75 a week. She also worked with bandleaders Dick Jurgens and Freddy Martin.

Career
In the summer of 1942, Haver moved to Hollywood, where she finished high school. She acted in plays in her spare time, and during a performance as a southern belle, she was discovered by a scout from 20th Century Fox. In 1943, Haver signed a $3,500-a-week contract with the studio and made her film debut playing an uncredited role as a hat-check girl in The Gang's All Here. She was dropped shortly after, because the studio executives felt that she looked too young, but was later resigned, after her costume and hairstyle were changed.

20th Century Fox had plans to mold Haver as a glamour girl stand-in for the studio's two biggest stars, Alice Faye and Betty Grable. She debuted on screen in a supporting role as Cri-Cri in Home in Indiana (1944). According to the actress, she had just turned 17 years old when her scenes were filmed. Even before Home in Indiana was released, she was assigned to replace Alice Faye in the Technicolor-musical, Irish Eyes Are Smiling. Later that year, she co-starred with her future husband, Fred MacMurray, in Where Do We Go From Here?, which was the only time the pair appeared together in a film.

During her career at Fox, Haver was originally groomed to be the next Betty Grable (standing a diminutive 5'2", 1.57 metres, she was known as "Pocket Grable"). She even co-starred with Grable in the 1945 film, The Dolly Sisters, for which she had to put on weight. While filming, rumors about a possible clash between the two actresses arose, mostly because of their frequent comparison, but Haver refuted this with: "Betty is a big star and I'm just starting. I try to be nice to her, and she reciprocated by being just as nice to me. It's silly to think two girls can't work together without quarreling. You see, I've two sisters. I'm the ham between the bread and butter — the middle sister — and I understand girls pretty well. Betty likes to talk about her baby, so we talk about her baby."

In 1946, she starred and received first-billing in Wake Up and Dream and Three Little Girls in Blue, both of which were well received and brought moderate success. The following year, the role of Katie was written into the film I Wonder Who's Kissing Her Now just for Haver.

Possibly best known for her roles in optimistic musicals, Haver's comedy star-turn in 1948's Scudda Hoo! Scudda Hay! was a major success. The same year, she starred as Marilyn Miller in the musical Look for the Silver Lining (1949). To resemble the actress as much as possible, Haver had to drive to the studio an hour earlier for make-up.

The following year, she starred in The Daughter of Rosie O'Grady and I'll Get By. In 1951, Haver was teamed with Fox's newest asset, Marilyn Monroe, and previous co-star William Lundigan (her co-star from I'll Get By), in the low-budget comedy, Love Nest. Though Haver was the lead and received top billing, most of the film's publicity centered on Monroe, who had a minor role and garnered under-the-title billing.  Love Nest was June Haver's only full-length film in black and white. Her other 15 releases between 1943 and 1953 were shot in three-strip Technicolor, something of a record for a Hollywood Golden Age actress.

Following her marriage to Fred MacMurray in 1954, Haver remained largely retired from acting (her last appearances were as herself on The Lucy-Desi Comedy Hour in 1958 and Disneyland '59). June Haver's final film appearance was in 1953's The Girl Next Door. Haver and MacMurray adopted two daughters and remained together until MacMurray's death in 1991.

At the urging of friends Ann Miller and Ann Rutherford, Haver finally joined the Academy of Motion Picture Arts and Sciences at the age of 75. For her contribution to the motion picture industry, June Haver has a star on the Hollywood Walk of Fame at 1777 Vine Street.

Personal life

Haver insisted she had always been very close with her family. Her sisters followed her to Hollywood and served as her stand-ins, while her mother was Haver's personal secretary.

On March 9, 1947, Haver married trumpet player James Zito. She met him at age 15, while touring with Ted Fio Rito's orchestra. They initially lost contact after Haver moved from Illinois to Beverly Hills, but started dating when Haver made a short visit to her home town when she was already a film actress. Haver filed for divorce less than a year after eloping with Zito, winning interlocutory decree on March 25, 1948. She admitted to the press the marriage was a failure from the beginning, saying: "I want to forget as soon as possible. We hadn't been married hours before I realized I had never really known Jimmy. He was a stranger. He was either down in the dumps or up high. I never knew from one moment to the next how he would be." Because she was a devout Catholic, Haver tried to make the marriage work, turning to the church to forget her unhappiness.

After her divorce from Zito, Haver started dating Dr. John L. Duzik, whom she had dated before her marriage to Zito; they planned on marrying, but Duzik died on October 31, 1949, following surgery complications. While taking care of him in his final days, she started attending church more often. According to friends, she was inspired to become a nun during this period. Following Duzik's death, Haver reportedly became tired of Hollywood, and never was really in love with the men she dated afterward. In February 1953, Haver became a postulant nun with the Sisters of Charity of Leavenworth, an organization based in Leavenworth, Kansas, and she stayed until October, saying she left because of "poor health".

Around this time, Haver met Fred MacMurray, one of the wealthier and more conservative men in Hollywood, and a romantic relationship developed. (When she was 18, she had worked on a film with him, but he was married at the time.) On June 28, 1954, they were married. She told the press: "When I married Fred, he was terribly set in his ways. He was a fuss-budget. He hadn't quite progressed to being a lint picker, but he was already an ash-tray emptier, and that's just about as set in his ways as a man can get." Haver insisted on adopting a girl, but MacMurray, 18 years her senior, initially refused, explaining he already had been a father. Shortly after, he agreed on adopting a child, and with the help of a doctor, they were able to take in twin daughters. He died in 1991.

Haver died from respiratory failure on July 4, 2005, in Brentwood, California, at the age of 79. She was buried with MacMurray at Holy Cross Cemetery in Culver City, California.

Haver was a Republican and supported Dwight Eisenhower during the 1952 presidential election.

Archive
The Academy Film Archive houses the Fred MacMurray-June Haver Collection. The film material at the Academy Film Archive is complemented by material in the Fred MacMurray and June Haver papers at the Academy's Margaret Herrick Library.

Filmography

References

External links

1926 births
2005 deaths
20th-century American actresses
21st-century American actresses
20th-century American singers
20th Century Studios contract players
Actresses from Illinois
American film actresses
Burials at Holy Cross Cemetery, Culver City
Deaths from respiratory failure
People from Brentwood, Los Angeles
People from Rock Island, Illinois
Catholics from Illinois
Illinois Republicans
California Republicans